Niall Guthrie (née Williams; born 21 April 1988) is a New Zealand rugby sevens player and former New Zealand international touch football captain. She is a member of New Zealand's women's national rugby sevens team and was selected for their squad to the 2016 Summer Olympics, where New Zealand claimed the silver medal behind Australia. In touch football she won gold at the 2005 Youth World Cup and silver at the 2011 Touch Football World Cup.

Williams was named in the Black Ferns Sevens squad for the 2022 Commonwealth Games in Birmingham. She won a bronze medal at the event. She also won a silver medal at the Rugby World Cup Sevens in Cape Town.

Personal life
Of Samoan and European descent, Niall, also known as "Nizzle", is the younger sister of All Black Sonny Bill Williams. She has a twin sister and two daughters. She married her long-term partner, Tama Guthrie, in December 2022.

References

External links
 New Zealand Profile
 

1988 births
Living people
New Zealand sportspeople of Samoan descent
New Zealand female rugby union players
New Zealand international rugby union players
New Zealand female rugby sevens players
New Zealand women's international rugby sevens players
Rugby sevens players at the 2016 Summer Olympics
Olympic rugby sevens players of New Zealand
Olympic silver medalists for New Zealand
Olympic medalists in rugby sevens
Medalists at the 2016 Summer Olympics
New Zealand twins
Rugby sevens players at the 2018 Commonwealth Games
Commonwealth Games rugby sevens players of New Zealand
Commonwealth Games gold medallists for New Zealand
Commonwealth Games medallists in rugby sevens
Rugby sevens players at the 2022 Commonwealth Games
Medallists at the 2018 Commonwealth Games
Medallists at the 2022 Commonwealth Games